Chionodes rhombus is a moth in the family Gelechiidae. It is found in North America, where it has been recorded from Arizona, Colorado, Washington, Wyoming, Nebraska, Nevada, New Mexico and California.

The larvae feed on Populus species.

References

Chionodes
Moths described in 1999
Moths of North America